Lectionary 59, designated by siglum ℓ 59 (in the Gregory-Aland numbering), is a Greek manuscript of the New Testament, on parchment leaves. Palaeographically it has been assigned to the 12th century. 
Formerly it was labelled as Apost. 13.

Description 

The codex contains lessons from the Acts of the Apostles and Epistles. It is a lectionary (Apostolos). It is written in Greek minuscule letters, on 311 parchment leaves. Written in two columns per page, in 23 lines per page.

It contains verse of Acts 8:37.

History 

The manuscript once belonged to the Iviron monastery at Athos. It was renovated by Joakim, a monk, in A. D. 1525. It was brought to Moscow in 1655. The manuscript was examined by Matthaei, cited by Tregelles as Frag. Mosq.

The manuscript is cited in the critical editions of the Greek New Testament (UBS3).

Currently the codex is located in the State Historical Museum, (V. 21, S. 4) in Moscow.

See also 

 List of New Testament lectionaries
 Biblical manuscript
 Textual criticism

References

Further reading 

 C. F. Matthaei, Novum Testamentum Graece et Latine (Riga, 1782-1788). 

Greek New Testament lectionaries
12th-century biblical manuscripts